Cabreros del Río (Leonese: Cabreiros del Ríu)) is a municipality located in the province of León, Castile and León, Spain. According to the 2010 census (INE), the municipality has a population of 481 inhabitants.

People from Cabreros del Río
 Gregorio Baro (1928–2012), Spanish-Argentine scientist

References

Municipalities in the Province of León